Boris Godál (born 27 May 1987) is a Slovak footballer who plays as a centre back for Al-Adalah in Saudi Professional League on loan from Železiarne Podbrezová of the Slovak Fortuna Liga.

Club career
In February 2013, Godál joined Polish club Zagłębie Lubin on a two and half-year contract.

He was transferred to Spartak Trnava in June 2015.

Honours

Club
Spartak Trnava
 Fortuna Liga: 2017–18

AEL Limassol
 Cypriot Cup: 2018–19

Individual
 Fortuna Liga: Player of the Season 2017–18

References

External links

1987 births
Living people
People from Nové Mesto nad Váhom District
Sportspeople from the Trenčín Region
Slovak footballers
Slovak expatriate footballers
Association football defenders
AS Trenčín players
Zagłębie Lubin players
FC Spartak Trnava players
AEL Limassol players
FK Železiarne Podbrezová players
Al-Adalah FC players
Slovak Super Liga players
Ekstraklasa players
Cypriot First Division players
2. Liga (Slovakia) players
Saudi Professional League players
Expatriate footballers in Poland
Slovak expatriate sportspeople in Poland
Expatriate footballers in Cyprus
Slovak expatriate sportspeople in Cyprus
Expatriate footballers in Saudi Arabia
Slovak expatriate sportspeople in Saudi Arabia